The eleventh season of the American animated television series The Simpsons originally aired on the Fox Network in the United States between September 26, 1999 and May 21, 2000, starting with "Beyond Blunderdome" and ending with "Behind the Laughter". With Mike Scully as the showrunner for the eleventh season, it has twenty-two episodes, including four hold-over episodes from the season 10 production line. Season 11 was released on DVD in Region 1 on October 7, 2008 with both a standard box and Krusty-molded plastic cover.

The season coincided with The Simpsons family being awarded their star on Hollywood's Walk of Fame, the season receiving itself an Emmy Award for Outstanding Animated Program, an Annie Award, and a British Comedy Award. It also saw the departure of voice actress Maggie Roswell. The Simpsons ranked 41st in the season ratings with an average U.S. viewership of 8.8 million viewers, making it the second highest rated show on Fox after Malcolm in the Middle. It got an 18-49 Nielsen Rating of 8.2//13.

Production
Towards the end of the production of season 10, voice actress Maggie Roswell, who voiced Helen Lovejoy, Maude Flanders and Miss Hoover, among others, left the show because of a contract dispute. She returned to the show in season 14. As a result of Roswell's leaving, Marcia Mitzman Gaven was brought to voice many of her characters, but it was decided to kill off Maude Flanders in the episode "Alone Again, Natura-Diddily" to open new storylines for that episode. Gaven started voicing Roswell's characters in hold-over season 10 episode "Brother's Little Helper".

Writers credited with episodes in the 11th season include Al Jean, Dan Greaney, Donick Cary, Tim Long, Ian Maxtone-Graham, Carolyn Omine, Mike Scully, Matt Selman, John Swartzwelder and George Meyer. Animation directors included Bob Anderson, Mike B. Anderson, Mark Kirkland, Lance Kramer, Nancy Kruse, Lauren MacMullan, Pete Michels, Steven Dean Moore, Matthew Nastuk, Michael Polcino and Jim Reardon.

Voice cast & characters

After the departure of Maggie Roswell, it was decided to kill-off Maude Flanders in order to open new storylines. In the episode "Alone Again, Natura-Diddily", Maude was killed off The character was voiced by Marcia Mitzman Gaven at that time.

Main cast
 Dan Castellaneta as Homer Simpson, Grampa Simpson, Krusty the Clown, Groundskeeper Willie, Barney Gumble, Santa's Little Helper, and various others
 Julie Kavner as Marge Simpson, Patty Bouvier, Selma Bouvier and various others
 Nancy Cartwright as Bart Simpson, Nelson Muntz, Ralph Wiggum and various others
 Yeardley Smith as Lisa Simpson
 Harry Shearer as Mr. Burns, Waylon Smithers, Ned Flanders, Principal Skinner, Lenny Leonard, Kent Brockman, Reverend Lovejoy, and various others
 Hank Azaria as Moe Szyslak, Chief Wiggum, Professor Frink, Comic Book Guy, Apu, Bumblebee Man and various others

Recurring
 Pamela Hayden as Milhouse van Houten, Jimbo Jones and various others
 Marcia Mitzman Gaven as Maude Flanders, Helen Lovejoy and Miss Hoover
 Russi Taylor as Martin Prince
 Tress MacNeille as Agnes Skinner and various others (this was also the first season to have Tress MacNeille performing voices in every episode)
 Marcia Wallace as Edna Krabappel
 Karl Wiedergott as additional characters

Guest stars
 Mel Gibson as himself  ("Beyond Blunderdome")
 Jack Burns as Edward Christian  ("Beyond Blunderdome")
 Mark McGwire as himself ("Brother's Little Helper")
 Ed Asner as the newspaper editor ("Guess Who's Coming to Criticize Dinner?")
 Tom Arnold as himself ("Treehouse of Horror X")
 Dick Clark as himself ("Treehouse of Horror X")
 Lucy Lawless as herself ("Treehouse of Horror X")
 Frank Welker as Werewolf Ned Flanders ("Treehouse of Horror X")
 The B-52's sing "Glove Slap" ("E-I-E-I-(Annoyed Grunt)")
 Penn & Teller as themselves ("Hello Gutter, Hello Fadder")
 Ron Howard as himself ("Hello Gutter, Hello Fadder")
 Pat O'Brien as himself ("Hello Gutter, Hello Fadder")
 Nancy O'Dell as herself ("Hello Gutter, Hello Fadder")
 Jan Hooks as Manjula Nahasapeemapetilon ("Eight Misbehavin'", "Take My Wife, Sleaze")
 Garry Marshall as Larry Kidkill ("Eight Misbehavin'")
 Butch Patrick as himself ("Eight Misbehavin'")
 John Goodman as Meathook ("Take My Wife, Sleaze")
 Henry Winkler as Ramrod ("Take My Wife, Sleaze")
 Jay North as himself ("Take My Wife, Sleaze")
 NRBQ as themselves ("Take My Wife, Sleaze")

Release

Reception
One of the most controversial moments in the show among fans was the kill-off of Maude Flanders, which was met with strong criticism but was decided by the show's producers to open new story lines for the series.

Awards

Aside from winning several awards in 2000, The Simpsons family themselves were awarded on January 14, 2000, their own star on Hollywood's Walk of Fame at 7021 Hollywood Boulevard. The 11th season itself gathered an Emmy Award for Outstanding Animated Program, as well as an Annie Award for Outstanding Achievement in a Primetime or Late Night Animated Television Program, and a British Comedy Award for Best International Comedy TV Show. Alf Clausen also received a 2000 Annie Award for Outstanding Individual Achievement for Music in an Animated Television Production for his work on the episode "Behind the Laughter". In the same year, "Treehouse of Horror X" won the CINE Golden Eagle Award.

In 2000, music editor Bob Beecher was nominated for the Golden Reel Award for "Treehouse of Horror X". At the Prism Awards, "Days of Wine and D'oh'ses" received a commendation in the Comedy Series Episode category in 2001 for its frank depiction of alcoholism and drug rehabilitation.  The show was also nominated for a Blimp Award in the Favorite Cartoon category at the 2000 Kids' Choice Awards, as well as for the Teen Choice Award in the category Choice TV Show — Comedy.

Episodes

DVD release

The DVD boxset for Season 11 was released by 20th Century Fox Home Entertainment in the United States and Canada on October 7, 2008, eight years after it had completed broadcast on television, in the UK on October 6, 2008, and in Australia on November 5, 2008. The special features include deleted scenes, storyboards/animatics, and commentaries.

The set was released in two different packagings: a standard rectangular cardboard box featuring Krusty the Clown on the cover, and a "limited edition" plastic packaging molded to look like Krusty's head. This is first time that a character-themed packaging doesn't feature a main character from The Simpsons family. Unlike the previous seasons, the Collector's Edition packaging is a removable molded face attached to a cardboard sleeve, as opposed to a fully plastic clamshell. Both versions have changed from a digipak style of disc tray in previous seasons, to an accordion-style series of cardboard sleeves into which the discs slide. Following the release of the set, there were a number of complaints regarding the style of packaging due to the fact that the cardboard packaging may scratch the discs; David Lambert of TVShowsOnDVD.com described the set as "functionally defective."

References
Specific

General

External links
Season 11 at The Simpsons.com

Simpsons season 11
1999 American television seasons
2000 American television seasons